The 2019 Alabama A&M Bulldogs football team represented Alabama Agricultural and Mechanical University as a member of the East Division of the Southwestern Athletic Conference during the 2019 NCAA Division I FCS football season. Led by second-year head coach Connell Maynor, the Bulldogs compiled an overall record of 7–5 with a mark of 4–3 in conference play, tying for second place in the SWAC's East Division. The team played its home games at Louis Crews Stadium in Huntsville, Alabama .

Previous season

The Bulldogs finished the 2018 season 6–5, 4–3 in SWAC play to finish in second place in the East Division.

Coaching staff

Preseason

Preseason polls
The SWAC released their preseason poll on July 16, 2019. The Bulldogs were picked to finish in second place in the East Division.

Preseason All–SWAC teams
The Bulldogs placed five players on the preseason all–SWAC teams.

All SWAC First Team
TE Kendric Johnson
Armoni Holloway – LB

All SWAC Second Team
Aqeel Glass – QB
Shonye Reams – OL
Brian Jenkins – WR

Postseason
SWAC Freshman of the Year - WR Abdul Fatai-Ibrahim

All SWAC First Team
RB Jordan Bentley (BoxToRow All-American)
WR Abdul Fatai-Ibrahim
DE Marcus Cushine (BoxToRow All-American)
PK Spencer Corey 

All SWAC Second Team
QB Aqeel Glass
WR Zabrian Moore
TE Kendric Johnson
OL Shonye Reams
OL Tevoris Butler
LB Armoni Holloway

Bentley broke several Alabama A&M records: Single-season rushing yards, career rushing yards (3,204), single-game rushing yards (245), rushing touchdowns (18), career touchdowns (43), single-season points (122) and career points (260). Ibrahim finished the season with 1,004 receiving yards and 11 touchdowns on 59 receptions. Cushine, a 6-2 and 220-pound defensive end from Broward County, Fla., emerged this season as one of the conference's top pass rushers, leading Alabama A&M with seven sacks and 13 tackles for loss. Corey finished the season 49 of 50 on extra point attempts, and he made 5-of-9 field goal attempts, including a 44-yarder. 

Glass led the SWAC in passing while setting a new Alabama A&M records with 3,600 passing yards and 32 passing touchdowns. Zabrian Moore led the SWAC in receiving with 1,057 yards and nine touchdowns on 58 receptions. Johnson finished the season with 275 yards and four touchdowns on 24 receptions.
Holloway set a new Alabama A&M record with 114 tackles, averaging 9.5 tacklers per game and led the team with 14 tackles for loss.

Schedule

Game summaries

vs. Morehouse

Arkansas–Pine Bluff

at North Alabama

at Samford

vs. Central State

Texas Southern

at Grambling State

vs. Alabama State

at Southern

Jackson State

at Alcorn State

Mississippi Valley State

References

Alabama AandM
Alabama AandM Bulldogs football team
Alabama A&M Bulldogs football seasons